Kimberworth Old Boys F.C. was an English association football club from Sheffield, South Yorkshire. The club reached the third qualifying round of the FA Cup in 1919/20, a year after winning the Sheffield & Hallamshire Junior Cup.

References

Defunct football clubs in England
Defunct football clubs in South Yorkshire
Sheffield Amateur League